Henry Wilbur Palmer (July 10, 1839 – February 15, 1913) was a Republican member of the U.S. House of Representatives from Pennsylvania. Henry Palmer was the father of Bradley Palmer, a Boston lawyer known for his involvement with United Fruit Company, Gillette, and ITT Corporation.

Early life

Henry W. Palmer was born in Clifford Township, Pennsylvania on July 10, 1839 to Gideon Palmer, who moved to Pennsylvania from Massachusetts in 1836. He attended Wyoming Seminary in  Kingston, Pennsylvania, and Fort Edward Institute in Fort Edward, New York.  He graduated from the National Law School in Poughkeepsie, New York, in 1860.

Career

In 1861 he was admitted to the bar in Peekskill, New York, and in Wilkes-Barre, Pennsylvania, in 1861.  He served as prothonotary's clerk in 1861, and served in the pay department of the Union Army at New Orleans in 1862 and 1863.  He was a member of the constitutional convention of Pennsylvania in 1872 and 1873, and served as attorney general of the State in 1879 through 1883.

Palmer was elected as a Republican to the Fifty-seventh, Fifty-eighth, and Fifty-ninth Congresses.  He was one of the managers appointed by the United States House of Representatives in 1905 to conduct the impeachment proceedings against Charles Swayne, judge of the United States Court for the Northern District of Florida. He was again elected to the Sixty-first Congress. He practiced law until his death in Wilkes-Barre on February 15, 1913. He was interred in Hollenback Cemetery.

Family

Henry Palmer married Ellen Webster in September 1861. Ellen W. Palmer was an important social reformer of the late nineteenth century, particularly known for her work in securing fair pay for breaker boys in Luzerne County, Pennsylvania.

Palmer had six children, two sons and four daughters. Their eldest son, Bradley Palmer, was an important Boston lawyer who helped form United Fruit Company, Gillette, and ITT Corporation. He served on the board of directors for these and many other companies as well as representing President Woodrow Wilson at the Paris Peace Conference.

References

Sources

The Political Graveyard
Ellen W. Palmer 
Bradley Palmer

1839 births
1913 deaths
People from the Scranton–Wilkes-Barre metropolitan area
State and National Law School alumni
Pennsylvania Attorneys General
Republican Party members of the United States House of Representatives from Pennsylvania
19th-century American politicians